The men's K-1 slalom canoeing event at the 2020 Summer Olympics took place on 28 and 30 July 2021 at the Kasai Canoe Slalom Course. 24 canoeists from 24 nations competed. Jiří Prskavec from the Czech Republic won the event, Jakub Grigar from Slovakia was second, and Hannes Aigner from Germany third. Prskavec and Aigner were bronze medalists in this event at the 2016 and 2012 Olympics, respectively; for Grigar, this is the first Olympic medal.

Background
This was the ninth appearance of the event, having previously appeared in every Summer Olympics with slalom canoeing: 1972 and 1992–2016.

Reigning Olympic champion Joe Clarke did not make the Great Britain team, with that nation selecting Bradley Forbes-Cryans instead. Reigning World Champion Jiří Prskavec of the Czech Republic, who won bronze at the 2016 Games, earned a place for his nation.

Qualification

A National Olympic Committee (NOC) could enter only 1 qualified canoeist in the men's slalom K-1 event. A total of 24 qualification places were available, allocated as follows:

 1 place for the host nation, Japan
 18 places awarded through the 2019 ICF Canoe Slalom World Championships
 5 places awarded through continental tournaments, 1 per continent

Qualifying places were awarded to the NOC, not to the individual canoeist who earned the place.

The World Championships quota places were allocated as follows:

Continental and other places:

Notes
The quota for the Americas was allocated to the NOC with the highest-ranked eligible athlete, due to the cancellation of the 2021 Pan American Championships.

Competition format
Slalom canoeing uses a three-round format, with heats, semifinal, and final. In the heats, each canoeist has two runs at the course with the better time counting. The top 20 advance to the semifinal. In the semifinal, the canoeists get a single run; the top 10 advance to the final. The best time in the single-run final wins gold.

The canoe course is approximately 250 metres long, with up to 25 gates that the canoeist must pass in the correct direction. Penalty time is added for infractions such as passing on the wrong side or touching a gate. Runs typically last approximately 95 seconds.

Schedule
All times are Japan Standard Time (UTC+9)

The men's slalom K-1 took place over two separate days.

Results
Qualification Rules: 1 to 20 to Semi-final, rest eliminated. 

Qualification Rules: 1 to 10 to Final, rest eliminated.

References

Men's slalom K-1
Men's events at the 2020 Summer Olympics